Huw Jenkins is managing partner at BTG Pactual investment bank.

Huw Jenkins may also refer to:

Huw Jenkins (Welsh businessman) (born 1963), chairman of Swansea City A.F.C.
Huw Jenkins (cricketer) (1944–2013), Welsh cricketer

See also
Jenkins (surname)